Brian Kinsey (born 4 March 1938) is an English former professional footballer who played as a left back in the Football League.

References

According to Jimmy Seed's autobiography Kinsey was his last signing for Charlton before parting from the club. He signed Kinsey as "an eighteen-year-old left-winger from Bromley". "He was my last official signing, and I am confident he will one day keep up Charlton´s tradition in match-winning outside-lefts. Indeed, he has all the qualities which would go to make him the most successful winger of them all."

External links
Brian Kinsey's Career

1938 births
Living people
English footballers
Footballers from Charlton, London
Association football midfielders
Charlton Athletic F.C. players
Bromley F.C. players
Tonbridge Angels F.C. players
English Football League players
Cape Town City F.C. (NFL) players
National Football League (South Africa) players